Sarsa na uyang, or simply sarsa, is a Filipino dish made from pounded freshwater shrimp, shredded coconut, chilis, ginger, peppercorns and other spices wrapped in coconut leaves and boiled in coconut milk. It originates from the islands of Romblon. It is eaten paired with plain rice.

See also

 Linapay
 Halabos
 Ginataang hipon
 Shrimp paste
 List of seafood dishes
 List of shrimp dishes

References

External links
 

Shrimp dishes
Philippine seafood dishes
Chili pepper dishes
Spicy foods
Foods containing coconut